The Châteauroux Classic de l'Indre Trophée Fenioux was a single-day road bicycle race held annually in August in the region of Indre, France, starting and finishing in Châteauroux. It was created in 2004 and since 2005 the race had been organized as a 1.1 event on the UCI Europe Tour, also being part of the Coupe de France de cyclisme sur route. After the 2014 edition, the race was discontinued.

Winners

References

External links
  
 History, winner list with link to all results

UCI Europe Tour races
Recurring sporting events established in 2004
2004 establishments in France
Cycle races in France
2014 disestablishments in Italy
Recurring sporting events disestablished in 2014
Defunct cycling races in France